The Mint Canyon Formation (Tm) is a Miocene geologic formation in the Sierra Pelona Mountains of Los Angeles County, southern California. The formation preserves fossils dating back to the Middle to Late Miocene (Barstovian and Clarendonian in NALMA classification).

Geology 
Mint Canyon is a fluvial landform in the Sierra Pelona range. It consists of terrestrial deposits from streams and lakes consisting mostly of sandstone and conglomerate with some claystone.

The formation correlates with the Caliente Formation in the Plush Ranch Basin to the northwest and the lower Punchbowl Formation in the Punchbowl Block to the southeast. The Mint Canyon Formation consists primarily of fluvial, alluvial, and lacustrine conglomerates, sandstones, and mudstones. The Mint Canyon Formation is overlain by the dominantly marine Castaic Formation, which consists of shale, sandstone, and minor conglomerate. In the Texas Canyon sub-basin, the formation is overlain by the Saugus Formation. The contact between the Mint Canyon and Castaic Formations is an angular unconformity in some places, and it is apparently conformable and gradational in others.

Fossil content 
The formation preserves vertebrate fossils dating back to the Middle Miocene subperiod of the Neogene period:

Mammals

Artiodactyls 

 ?Merycodus sp.
 Camelidae indet.
 Tayassuidae indet.

Perissodactyls 

 Hipparion cf. forcei
 Hipparion sp.
 ?Nannippus sp.
 Equini indet.
 Hipparionini indet.
 Rhinocerotidae indet.

Rodents 
 Pronotolagus apachensis

Proboscideans 
 Gomphotherium sp.

Carnivora 
 Canidae indet.

See also 

 
 List of fossiliferous stratigraphic units in California
 Paleontology in California
 Diligencia Formation
 Plush Ranch Formation

References

Bibliography

Further reading 
 Geology of the Mint Canyon Area by William T. Holser, 1946

Geologic formations of California
Miocene Series of North America
Miocene California
Langhian
Serravallian
Tortonian
Barstovian
Clarendonian
Conglomerate formations
Mudstone formations
Sandstone formations of the United States
Alluvial deposits
Fluvial deposits
Lacustrine deposits
Paleontology in California
Geology of Los Angeles County, California
Sierra Pelona Ridge